Colchian culture (8000 BCE to 600 BCE) is Neolithic - (Later Lazian culture) an early Bronze Age and Iron Age culture of the western Caucasus, mostly in western Georgia. It was partially succeeded by the Koban culture in northern and central Caucasus.

It is named after the ancient geographic region of Colchis (Later Lazica), which covered a large area along the Black Sea coast. It is mainly known for highly developed bronze production and artistic craftsmanship. There are many items of copper and bronze found in ancient graves. Graves found and studied have been located in the Abkhazia region, the Sukhumi mountain complexes, the Racha highlands where brick tiles and graffiti have been found, and the Colchian plains where collective graves have been found.

Collective graves occurred during the last stages of the Colchian culture (c.8th millennium to 6th century BCE). In these graves bronze items were found that represented foreign trade occurred with the Colchian culture. At this time an increase in the production of weapons and agricultural tools is seen. Evidence of copper mining has been found in Racha, Abkhazia, Svaneti, and Adjara. Ruins of palaces are present in the Colchian Plains.

Colchian culture is characterized by Colchian axes, sickles, short spears, flat axes, bow-shaped and cylindrical axes, belts, bracelets, bearings, and statuettes. The items are often painted and sometimes even with the sculptural expression expressing the religious ideas of the Colchis. Colchians are the ancestors of the most notably Zans/Chans (ჭანები) - Megrelians and the Laz people, as well as Svans of the northern region of Svaneti in Georgia.

See also
 Colchis
 Prehistoric Georgia

References

External links

 
Archaeological cultures of the Caucasus
Archaeological cultures of West Asia
Archaeological cultures of Eastern Europe
Bronze Age cultures of Asia
Bronze Age cultures of Europe
Iron Age cultures of Asia
Archaeological cultures in Georgia (country)
Archaeological cultures in Russia